The Easy Sin is a 2002 novel from Australian author Jon Cleary. It was the nineteenth (and penultimate) book featuring Sydney detective Scobie Malone. The plot concerns the murder of a housemaid to a dot com millionaire. Kidnappers thought they have grabbed the millionaire's girlfriend, not realising they've taken the millionaire instead. Matters are complicated by the involvement of the Yakuza.

References

External links
The Easy Sin at AustLit (subscription required)

2002 Australian novels
Novels set in Sydney
HarperCollins books
Novels by Jon Cleary